Adelino da Rocha Vieira, known as Nito (born 5 July 1967) is a former Portuguese football player.

He played 11 seasons and 285 games in the Primeira Liga for Belenenses, Rio Ave, Sporting Espinho and Tirsense.

Club career
He made his Primeira Liga debut for Sporting Espinho on 23 August 1987 in a game against Marítimo.

References

1967 births
Living people
Portuguese footballers
S.C. Espinho players
Primeira Liga players
Liga Portugal 2 players
C.F. Os Belenenses players
F.C. Tirsense players
Rio Ave F.C. players
Association football defenders
Sportspeople from Viana do Castelo District